Sardar Muhammad Nawaz Khan rind  is a Pakistani politician who was a Member of the Provincial Assembly of the Punjab, from 1993 to 1997 and again from May 2013 to May 2018.

Early life and education
He was born on 4 June 1948 in Zahir Pir.

He has a degree of Bachelor of Laws which he obtained in 2007 from Allama Iqbal Open University.

Political career
He ran for the seat of the Provincial Assembly of the Punjab as a candidate of Pakistan Democratic Alliance (PDA) from Constituency PP-234 (Rahimyar Khan-III) in 1990 Pakistani general election, but was unsuccessful. He received 17,123 votes and lost the seat to Mian Abdul Sattar.

He was elected to the Provincial Assembly of the Punjab as a candidate of Pakistan Peoples Party (PPP) from Constituency PP-234 (Rahimyar Khan-III) in 1993 Pakistani general election. He received 29,284 votes and defeated Mian Abdul Sattar.

He ran for the seat of the Provincial Assembly of the Punjab as a candidate of PPP from Constituency PP-234 (Rahimyar Khan-III) in 1990 Pakistani general election, but was unsuccessful. He received 26,257 votes and lost the seat to Mian Abdul Sattar.

He was re-elected to the Provincial Assembly of the Punjab as an independent candidate from Constituency PP-288 (Rahimyar Khan-IV) in 2013 Pakistani general election. He joined Pakistan Muslim League (N) in May 2013.

References

Living people
Punjab MPAs 2013–2018
1948 births
Pakistan Muslim League (N) politicians
Punjab MPAs 1993–1996